Smithers is a surname of English origin. It derives from the Middle English term "smyther", referring to a metalsmith, and is thus related to the common occupational surname Smith. The name Smither is related.

People 
Alan Smithers (born 1938), English educationalist
Sir Alfred Waldron Smithers (1850–1924), British financier and parliamentarian, after whom the town of Smithers, British Columbia was named.
Collier Twentyman Smithers (1867–1943), painter
Don Smithers (born 1933), music historian and musician
Jan Smithers (born 1949), American actress best known for her role in WKRP in Cincinnati
Joy Smithers (born 1963), Australian actress
Leonard Smithers (1861–1907), English publisher and translator
Nathaniel B. Smithers (1818–1896), American lawyer and politician
Sir Peter Smithers (1913–2006), British politician
Reay Smithers (1907–1987), South African zoologist
Sir Waldron Smithers (1880–1954), British politician, son of Sir Alfred Waldron Smithers
William Smithers (born 1927), American actor

Fictional characters 
 Waylon Smithers, Mr. Burns' assistant in The Simpsons
 Smithers, one of Q's assistants in two James Bond films
 Samuel Smithers, also known as Plantman, a supervillain in the Marvel Comics Universe
 Derek Smithers, a character in the Alex Rider series
 Will Smithers, a minor character in The Hitchhiker's Guide to the Galaxy
 Smithers, Hiram Lodge's butler in Archie Comics
 Charlie Smithers, the contestant played by Ronnie Corbett in the spoof version of Mastermind by the Two Ronnies

See also 
 List of Old English (Anglo-Saxon) surnames

Notes 

English-language surnames
Surnames of English origin